Kheyrabad (also Romanized as Kheyrābād, Khairābād, and Kheir Abad) is a village in Qaryah ol Kheyr Rural District, in the Central District of Darab County, Fars Province, Iran. At the 2006 census, its population was 617, in 125 families.

References 

Populated places in Darab County